Pipal Park is located at 7770 Hascall Street in southwest Omaha, Nebraska.

Features
Pipal Park is a popular, barrier-free playground in Omaha.   The  park has a bridge, slides, swings, covered and uncovered picnic areas, a water feature and many art sculptures. The Pipal Park Community Center is located just south of the park.  This facility houses a licensed pre-school, meeting rooms and a games room.

Historic properties

Storm destruction
Pipal Park was one of the areas struck by one of the most destructive tornados in the history of the US. The tornado devastated parts of Omaha including Pipal Park on May 5, 1975. A memorial named "Patrick" was constructed by UNO sculpture professor Sidney Buchanan, and was dedicated on May 5, 1977, two years after the tornado struck Pipal Park. It stands on a grassy knoll overlooking the park and symbolizes the order being reestablished from the chaos the tornado created. The Pipal Park recreational area was officially dedicated in 1985.

See also
Neighborhoods of Omaha, Nebraska
History of Omaha

References

External links
Pipal Park

1977 establishments in Nebraska
Parks in Omaha, Nebraska